Dmitrovsky District is the name of several administrative and municipal districts in Russia. The districts' name generally derives from or is related to the male first name Dmitry.
Dmitrovsky District, Moscow, a district in Northern Administrative Okrug of Moscow
Dmitrovsky District, Moscow Oblast, an administrative and municipal district of Moscow Oblast
Dmitrovsky District, Oryol Oblast, an administrative and municipal district of Oryol Oblast

See also
Dmitrovsky (disambiguation)
Dmitriyevsky District

References